John Bullas Smith (August 11, 1917 – June 6, 2015) was an American football end in the National Football League for the Philadelphia Eagles and the Washington Redskins. He served in World War II and attended Stanford University. He died in June 2015 at the age of 97.

References

1917 births
2015 deaths
American football ends
Philadelphia Eagles players
Players of American football from Los Angeles
Stanford Cardinal football players
Washington Redskins players
American military personnel of World War II